Streptomyces hebeiensis is a bacterium species from the genus of Streptomyces which has been isolated from soil from the Hebei province in China.

See also 
 List of Streptomyces species

References

Further reading

External links
Type strain of Streptomyces hebeiensis at BacDive -  the Bacterial Diversity Metadatabase

hebeiensis
Bacteria described in 2004